Ewingella americana is a Gram-negative rod, and the only species in the genus Ewingella.  It was first identified and characterized in 1983. Ewingella is in the family Yersiniaceae.  The organism is rarely reported as a human pathogen, though it has been isolated from a variety of clinical specimens, including wounds, sputum, urine, stool, blood, synovial fluid, conjunctiva, and peritoneal dialysate.  The bacterium is named in honor of William H. Ewing, an American biologist who contributed to modern taxonomy.

Epidemiology

Respiratory-tract infections following retainment in intensive-care units has been observed in several instances. A case of E. americana causing osteomyelitis and septic arthritis of the shoulder joint in a previous intravenous drug abuser has also been reported. Vascular bypass surgery is a reported risk factor for colonization.  Debate currently exists as to this organism's predilection for immunocompromised patients.

Pathophysiology and biochemistry 

E. americana is an organism with simple nutritional needs that can survive in water and citrate solution, and preferentially grows at 4°C. Domestic sources of water, including air conditioning units, ice baths, and wound irrigation systems, have been cited as sources of infection.

References

External links
Type strain of Ewingella americana at BacDive -  the Bacterial Diversity Metadatabase

Bacteria described in 1984